The 11th Legislative Assembly of Himachal Pradesh was formed following the 2007 Assembly election for all 68 seats in the unicameral legislature. The term of 13th Assembly will expire in December 2012. 2012 Himachal Pradesh Legislative Assembly election will be conducted to form the next Himachal Pradesh Assembly.

Assembly Members (Eleventh Legislative Assembly)

Notes 
 Shri Sanjay Chaudhary lone member of BSP merged his Legislature Group into BJP Legislature Party on 17-12-2008.
 Shri Virbhadra Singh resigned from H.P. Legislative Assembly on 28-05-2009 after being elected to Lok Sabha from Mandi Parliamentary Constituency.
 Shri Rajan Sushant resigned from H.P. Legislative Assembly on 26-05-2009 after being elected to Lok Sabha from Kangra Parliamentary Constituency.
 Shri Khushi Ram Balanatah and Shri Sujan Singh Pathania were elected in the by-election from the seats vacated by Shri Virbhadra Singh and Shri Rajan Sushant respectively.

See also 
Government of Himachal Pradesh
Eighth Assembly
Ninth Assembly
Tenth Assembly
Twelfth Assembly

References

Himachal Pradesh Legislative Assembly